Xiaolan Bao (1949 – January 22, 2006) was a Burmese-American historian, educator, and researcher. Her academic field was Chinese and Chinese American women's history and labor history.

Early life and education 
Bao was born and raised in Rangoon, Burma. In 1975 she completed her B.A. at Beijing Teachers College, followed by an M.A. from Jinan University in 1981. In 1984 she continued her studies at New York University, where she earned a Ph.D. in History in 1991. She continued her research on New York-based Chinese women garment workers after she completed her doctoral work. Bao could speak Burmese, English, Mandarin, Taishanese, and several other dialects of Cantonese.

Career 
Bao's first teaching position was at Albion College from 1991-1993. Next, she was a professor of history at California State University Long Beach during the period 1993 to 1996. Her 2001 book, Holding Up More Than Half the Sky, Chinese Women Garment Workers in New York City, 1948-92, is noted as an important and breakthrough work by many scholars in her field, particularly because it focused on labor history of Asian Americans.

Bao was also the founder of the US-based international organization, Chinese Society for Women's Studies (CSWS). She and Wu Xu were organizers of several collaborations between the CSWS and various Chinese institutions, and were funded by the Ford Foundation. These included the 1993 First Chinese Women and Development Conference co-sponsored with the Center for Women’s Studies at Tianjin Normal University, which focused on the concept of gender and led to the publishing of a number of works, including Bao's Xifang nüxing zhuyi pingjie (On Western Feminist Research), which was influential in feminist circles in China. In 1997, in Nanjing, participants in the Second Chinese Women and Development Conference sought to identify and integrate appropriate contemporary Western feminist thought into Chinese scholarship. Finally, in 1998, Bao and Xu collaborated with the Sichuan Women’s Federation Women’s Studies Institute to bring together gender studies scholars and development specialists knowledgeable about China at the Gender, Poverty and Rural Development Participatory Workshop in Chengdu.

Death 
Bao died of breast cancer in 2006.  The Xiaolan Bao Memorial Scholarship, honoring research on Asian or Asian American women, is named in her honor.

Selected works
 
 Bao, Xiaolan, ed. (1995). Xifang niixingzhuyi yanjiu pingjie [An introduction to Western feminist scholarship]. Beijing: Sanlian Bookstore.

References

1949 births
2006 deaths
20th-century American historians
California State University, Long Beach faculty
People from Yangon
Burmese emigrants to the United States
Burmese people of Chinese descent
American writers of Chinese descent
20th-century American women writers
21st-century American women writers
20th-century Burmese women writers
21st-century Burmese women writers
20th-century Burmese writers
21st-century Burmese writers
21st-century American non-fiction writers
American women historians